20 Leonis Minoris is a binary star system in the northern constellation of Leo Minor. It is faintly visible to the naked eye, having an apparent visual magnitude of +5.4. Based upon an annual parallax shift of 66.46 mas, it is located 49 light years from the Sun. The star has a relatively high proper motion and is moving away from the Sun with a radial velocity of +56 km/s. The system made its closest approach about 150,000 years ago when it came within .

It has 12% more mass and a 25% larger radius than the Sun. The star is about seven billion years old and is spinning with a rotation period of 10.6 days. The small companion is an active red dwarf star that has a relatively high metallicity. The two stars are currently separated by 14.5 arc seconds, corresponding to a projected separation of 2016 AU.

In 2020, a candidate exoplanet was detected orbiting 20 Leonis Minoris (HD 86728). With a minimum mass of 0.032  (10.2 ) and an orbital period of 31 days, this would most likely be a hot Neptune.

References

External links

See also
 TOI-755
 1 Geminorum
 Hot Neptune

G-type main-sequence stars
M-type main-sequence stars
Leonis Minoris, 20
Binary stars
Leo Minor
Durchmusterung objects
Leonis Minoris, 20
0376
086728
049081
3951